Manfred Grieshofer (born 4 April 1945) is an Austrian rower. He competed in the men's coxed pair event at the 1972 Summer Olympics.

References

1945 births
Living people
Austrian male rowers
Olympic rowers of Austria
Rowers at the 1972 Summer Olympics
Place of birth missing (living people)